Raúl Augusto Leiro Correia Mendes (1949-2015) was an Angolan television journalist and filmmaker. He worked for Televisão Pública de Angola (TPA) as a cameraman, editor, producer and director.

Life
Raúl Correia Mendes was born on September 3, 1949, in Luanda. He started his professional career as a television producer at TVA in 1972, working on sport, music and news programs. In 1974 he joined Televisão Pública de Angola, and was part of the team who made the first official television broadcast in Angola.

He died in Luanda in March 2015. The Angolan Minister of Social Communication, José Luís de Matos, issued a public statement in his memory.

Films
 Algodão, 1977
 Sahara a coragem vem no vento. Short documentary, 1977.
 Bom Dia Camarada, 1978
 O Ouro branco de Angola, 1978
 Louanda Luanda, 1980
 O Encontro, 1980
 O Legado do Gigante, 1980
 A Nossa Musica, 1980
 Kitala, 1982
 Jidanti Jimba, 1982

References

Angolan journalists
Angolan film directors
1949 births
2015 deaths